Marc Woolnough (born 20 May 1980) is a former Australian rules footballer who played six games for Geelong in 1998 and 2002. 

Woolnough was raised on the Gold Coast, Queensland and attended All Saints Anglican School with Kurt Tippett both representing the school in the Independent Schools competition before going on to play with the Southport Sharks in the QAFL

He is the son of former Geelong and Collingwood player Michael Woolnough.

After retiring from playing, he coached St Mary's in the Geelong Football League. He was appointed coach of the Melbourne University Football Club in 2008.

References

External links
 
 

1980 births
Living people
Geelong Football Club players
Southport Australian Football Club players
Australian rules footballers from Queensland